Yateri or Yatri may refer to:
 Yateri-ye Bala
 Yateri-ye Pain
 Yateri Rural District